Kathryn Elizabeth Bouse Le Veque Hogan is an American USA Today bestselling independent author of Historical Romance fiction novels. She is the author of over 100 published Historical and Contemporary romance novels. She is most known for writing the successful de Wolfe Pack series, including Warwolfe, The Wolfe, Nighthawk, Serpent, and A  Wolfe Among Dragons.

Early life and education 
Le Veque was born in 1964 in Glendale, California, and raised in Pasadena, California where she graduated from Pasadena High School in 1982. She attended University of Southern California. She started writing as a hobby when she was thirteen.

Career 
Le Veque continued writing throughout high school, college, and while working full-time and raising her two children.  When she was 28, she started submitting her works to traditional publishers, but was rejected due to her chosen genre not being considered "marketable enough" by them at the time.  With the rise in independent publishing on Amazon's Kindle platform in the early-2010s, on a whim, she uploaded her first novel for purchase on Amazon in May, 2012. One year later, due to the growing success of her novels, she was able to quit her day job, and focus on her writing full time.

In October, 2014, Le Veque was listed as the 31st "Most Read" author on Amazon. Her book, With Dreams Only of You was a USAToday bestselling book in July, 2015.   Since 2015, Le Veque has gone on to hit the USA Today Bestselling list 16 times.

Kathryn became CEO and Publisher of Dragonblade Publishing, Inc., a boutique publishing house specializing in Historical Romance with New York Times and USA Today Bestselling authors. Kathryn also formed WolfeBane Publishing when Kindle Worlds (Amazon) folded to continue publishing the connected World of de Wolfe Pack. She also manages the de Lyon shared universe with multiple authors.

Partial bibliography

De Wolfe Pack 
Warwolfe
The Wolfe
Nighthawk
ShadowWolfe
DarkWolfe
A Joyous de Wolfe Christmas
BlackWolfe
Serpent
A Wolfe Among Dragons
Scorpion
StormWolfe
Dark Destroyer
The Lion of the North
Walls of Babylon

Dragonblade series 
Dragonblade
The Savage Curtain
Island of Glass
The Fallen One
Fragments of Grace

The de Shera Brotherhood: Lords of Thunder 
The Thunder Knight
The Thunder Lord
The Thunder Warrior

Reign of the House of de Winter
Swords and Shields
Lespada

The DeRusse Legacy 
The Dark One: Dark Knight
The White Lord of Wellesbourne
Lord of War: Black Angel
Beast

De Lohr Dynasty 
Rise of the Defender
Archangel
Steelheart
Spectre of the Sword (House of du Bois)
Unending Love (House of du Bois)

Standalone books 
Lord of the Shadows
Highland Wishes
The Questing
The Whispering Night
Guardian of Darkness
Devil's Dominion
Netherworld
Tender is the Knight
Black Sword
While Angels Slept
The Crusader Saxon Lords of Hage book 1
Kingdom Come Saxon Lords of Hage book 2
Lord of War: Black Angel
The Dark Lord
With Dreams Only of You

References

American romantic fiction novelists
American women novelists
American historical novelists
21st-century American novelists
Living people
1964 births
21st-century American women writers
Women historical novelists
Women romantic fiction writers
Pasadena High School (California) alumni
University of Southern California alumni